Jorgisbel Álvarez Hernández (born 8 February 1985) is an amateur Cuban Greco-Roman wrestler, who played for the men's middleweight category. He defeated U.S. wrestler Ben Provisor for the gold medal in his division at the 2011 Pan American Games in Guadalajara, Mexico.

He qualified for the 2012 Summer Olympics in London by winning the Pan American qualification tournament but was replaced by Alexei Bell.

References

1985 births
Living people
Wrestlers at the 2011 Pan American Games
Pan American Games gold medalists for Cuba
Cuban male sport wrestlers
Pan American Games medalists in wrestling
Medalists at the 2011 Pan American Games
21st-century Cuban people